"Rip It Up" is a song by English indie rock band Razorlight, included as the sixth track on their 2004 debut album, Up All Night. It was also released as their second single in November 2003 and peaked at number 42 on the UK Singles Chart. A year later, on 29 November 2004, "Rip It Up" was re-released as the final single from the initial release of Up All Night and peaked at number 20 on the UK Singles Chart.

Track listings

Initial release
 7-inch
 "Rip It Up"
 "Here It Comes"

 CD1
 "Rip It Up"
 "Spirit"
 "Yes, You Should Know"

 CD2
 "Rip It Up"
 "When He Was Twenty"
 "Heartbreak Soup"

Re-release
 7-inch
 "Rip It Up"
 "Don't Go Back to Dalston" (Live from Brixton Academy)

 CD1
 "Rip It Up"
 "Just Can't Explain" (Live in Los Angeles)

 CD2
 "Rip It Up"
 "Fairytale of New York" (The Lamacq Session)
 "Stumble and Fall" (Live at One Big Weekend, Birmingham)

Charts

1 Re-release

References

2003 singles
2003 songs
2004 singles
Razorlight songs
Songs written by Johnny Borrell
Vertigo Records singles